Pađine is a hamlet in the municipality of Zvornik, Bosnia and Herzegovina. There is a museum where one can find various fossils from the Mesozoic era.

Population
According to the census of 1991, the town had 560 inhabitants, of whom 553 were Serbs.

See also
 Zvornik, a municipality

Zvornik